The following is a list of professional wrestling attendance records in Mexico. The list is dominated by the now defunct Mexican wrestling promotion Universal Wrestling Association (1975-1995) which was the main rival of Consejo Mundial de Lucha Libre, Mexico's oldest professional wrestling promotion, during the 1970s and 80s. The country's two biggest promotions, CMLL and Asistencia Asesoría y Administración, are tied with six events each. The U.S.-based World Wrestling Entertainment, which has controlled the industry in North America since 2002, has been slowly making inroads into the country holding several successful WWE Raw and WWE SmackDown television tapings at the El Palacio de los Deportes in Mexico City between 2006 and 2011.

According to this list, 3 events are from AAA's flagship TripleManía pay-per-view (PPV) event, which since 1994's Triplemanía II-C has been held exclusively in stadiums that typically have a seating capacity of at least 20,000 people or more. The company was founded by Antonio Peña after breaking away from CMLL in 1992. All but eleven of the events have been held in the capital city of Mexico City, while seven additional events have been held in the State of Mexico, and one each in Jalisco, Nayarit, and  Querétaro.

Events and attendances

Historical

Footnotes

References
General

Specific

External links
Supercards & Tournaments: Mexico
Wrestling attendance records in Mexico at Wrestlingdata.com

Lucha libre
M
Attendance records
Professional wrestling in Mexico
professional wrestling attendance records